Pind Sawika and Bair Faqiran  are  towns in Jhelum District of Punjab, Pakistan. It is part of Jhelum Tehsil. It is located at the right bank of the Bunhar River and at starting of Tilla Jogian mountain range, where the Tilla Satellite Launch Center is located. As Geography these are two separate towns but economics situation is so different Bair Faqiran and Pind Swika . The Pind sawika is avail some facilities but Bair Faqiran town is without all basic facilities.

EDUCATION 
Govt High school Pind Swika 
Popular People Master Muhammad Saleem Master Raja Riffat Kamal, Raja Muhammad Ihsan, Dr. Kaleem Aslam Mr. Naveed Anwar (*this is need for conversation with model school) Govt Model High School  Bair Faqiran.

Popular Peoples   
Col Muhammad Safdar (late) Bair Faqiran Sub Muhammad Yousef  Mrs Aneela Naseem - Educational expert of Mathematics Dr. Muhammad Yousaf S/O Sahib Khan Raja Muhammad Riaz   Recommendation The special need for development of education in this area round the Bair Faqiran town . As per geography these twfacilities. need facilities.

Health Facilities 
This village has a Dispensary of Red Crescent (Incharge Dr Haseeb Mirza) . And at a distance of three kilometres, the main Government BHU (Besic Health Unit) is the health hospital, which is called BHU Pind Sawika(Incharge Dr Azmat Kamal) but it is located within the boundaries of The Khair Sharif.To reach the hospital, you have to pass through a three km Bunhar River .

References

the location is big with landmark

Populated places in Jhelum District